Lochmocercus is an extinct genus of prehistoric coelacanth fishes which lived during the Carboniferous Period.

See also

 Sarcopterygii
 List of sarcopterygians
 List of prehistoric bony fish

References

Prehistoric lobe-finned fish genera

Carboniferous bony fish